Ringleader of the Tormentors is the eighth studio album by English alternative rock singer Morrissey. It was released on 3 April 2006 by record label Attack. The album was described as showcasing "a thicker, more rock-driven sound", which Morrissey attributed to new guitarist Jesse Tobias.

The album debuted at number 1 in the UK Albums Chart and number 27 in the US, and also reached number 1 in Sweden, Malta, and Greece.

Recording and production
Recording for the album commenced in late August 2005 in Rome, Italy. Mixing began in late October 2005. Originally Morrissey was to record the album with producer Jeff Saltzman, however, he could not undertake the project. Early in recording Morrissey's publicist described it, contradictingly, as "the most full-on rock record Morrissey's ever done.

Producer Tony Visconti, of T. Rex and David Bowie fame, took over the production role and Morrissey announced that Ringleader of the Tormentors is to be "the most beautiful—perhaps the most gentle—so far". Visconti wrote on his website:

The musicians recording with Morrissey in Rome were Alain Whyte, Boz Boorer, Jesse Tobias, Gary Day, Michael Farrell and Matt Chamberlain. Chamberlain replaced Dean Butterworth, who decided to continue drumming for the band Good Charlotte. Marco Origel, from the San Francisco area, handled engineering on the album.

Release
The album's opening track, "I Will See You in Far-off Places", was leaked on the internet on 2 February 2006.

"In the Future When All's Well" received some airplay in the United States on alternative rock radio.

Ringleader of the Tormentors was released on 3 April 2006. It became Morrissey's third number 1 album on the UK Albums Chart, selling 62,000 copies in its first week of release in the UK. It was also the first British album charting to include download sales, 1,200 of which were full album downloads of Ringleader of the Tormentors. The album peaked in its debut week at number 27 on the Billboard 200 in the U.S., and according to Nielsen SoundScan, has sold 98,000 in the U.S. as of August 2008.

Reception

Ringleader of the Tormentors received positive reviews from most critics. According to critic review aggregator Metacritic, the album received an average review score of 75/100, based on 34 critical reviews, indicating "Generally favorable reviews".
Andy Gill of The Independent wrote "Musically, it's both tougher and lusher than You Are the Quarry, with proper orchestrations replacing that album's nasty synthetic strings." Stephen Thomas Erlewine of AllMusic wrote "it's easy to enjoy Ringleader of the Tormentors as merely an everyday Morrissey record, but it's hard not to shake the suspicion that this album is the closest he's ever been to forgettable."

Track listing

Personnel
 Morrissey – vocals
 Alain Whyte – guitar, backing vocals
 Boz Boorer – guitar
 Jesse Tobias – guitar
 Gary Day – bass guitar
 Matt Chamberlain – drums
 Michael Farrell – piano, organ, keyboards, trumpet, trombone, percussion

Additional personnel
 Ennio Morricone – string arrangement on "Dear God Please Help Me"

Children's choir on "The Youngest Was the Most Loved", "The Father Who Must Be Killed" and "At Last I Am Born"
 Laura Adriani
 Gaia e Andrea Baroni
 Niccolo Centioni
 Julia D'Andrea
 Alice e Ester Diodovich
 Marco Lorecchio
 Charlotte Patrignani

Charts

Certifications and sales

References

External links
 

Morrissey albums
Albums produced by Tony Visconti
2006 albums
Sanctuary Records albums